Harmonia (died 215 BC), was a Sicilian princess, daughter of Gelo, the son of King Hiero II of Syracuse. She was the wife of Themistius.

Livy's history records that during the Second Punic War, the people of Syracuse rebelled against the royal family. The young king Hiero was murdered along with Themistius and Andronodorus, sons-in-law of Gelo and Hiero. The angry crowd then murdered the wives of Themistius and Andronodorus. Then with drawn swords they attacked the daughters of Hiero, Damarata and Heraclia, killing them both. 

They then went looking for Harmonia to finish their deeds. With the clever thinking on the part of Harmonia's nurse and protector, she found a girl that was of the same age and looks of Harmonia that was willing to go along with a ruse to protect the life of Harmonia. The nurse dressed her up in royal attire and made ready for the assassins. The girl did not object to the stratagem and was more than willing to sacrifice her life for the princess. When the assassins saw her they quickly finished her off with their daggers and swords. Harmonia watching the murder take place from her safe hiding place had mixed emotions of the event. She was elated by the courage of the girl, but devastated by her death. Harmonia burst into tears and committed suicide.

According to Valerius Maximus, Harmonia did not commit suicide, but to prove the same courage as the girl, she went in front of the murderers, saying she was the real princess, and was also killed.

References 
Virginia Brown's translation of Giovanni Boccaccio’s Famous Women, pp 139 – 140; Harvard University Press, 2001; 
Livy, Ab Urbe Condita, Livy's History of Rome Book 24 Chapters 24-29.
Valerius Maximus, Factorum et dictorum memorabilium libri, iii.2.ext.9

3rd-century BC Greek women
3rd-century BC Syracusans
215 BC deaths
Ancient people who committed suicide